William Leon Mounts (August 31, 1862–February 5, 1929) was an American lawyer and politician.

Mounts was born in Carlinville, Illinois. He graduated from Blackburn College in 1881 and was admitted to the Illinois bar in 1885. He practiced law in Carlinville and was involved with the banking business. He served as mayor of Carlinville. Mounts also served as city treasurer and city attorney for Carlinville. Mounts was involved with the Democratic Party. He served in the Illinois House of Representatives from 1893 to 1897 and in the Illinois Senate from 1897 to 1901. Mounts died at his home, in Carlinville, Illinois, from a long illness.

Notes

External links

1862 births
1929 deaths
People from Carlinville, Illinois
Blackburn College (Illinois) alumni
Illinois lawyers
Businesspeople from Illinois
Mayors of places in Illinois
Democratic Party members of the Illinois House of Representatives
Democratic Party Illinois state senators
19th-century American lawyers